Al Qunfudhah, also known as Kunfuda, is a Saudi city in the Tihamah region on the coast of the Red Sea. Its population is the fourth largest in Makkah Province, the area of the governate is estimated at 5,195 km², which occupies about 3.65% of the area of the region and is ranked ninth among the governorates of the region in terms of area. It is also one of the large sea ports of the Kingdom of Saudi Arabia on the Red Sea. Al Qunfudhah was founded in 1311 A.C-709 Hijri according to the ancient sources.

History

Al Qunfudah's origins date back to 709 at the beginning of the eighth century Hijri. Since ancient times, it received ocean-going trade caravans that traveled from Yemen to Syria and vice versa. The name Al Qunfudah did not appear in historical writings until with the beginning of the ninth century AH after the collapse of the Sultanate of Hali bin Yaaacob of Banu Kinanah tribe in Hali south of Al Qunfudhah.

The thirteenth century was the starting point for the campaigns of the Muhammad Ali Pasha, as it was an arena for fighting between the Ottomans and Italians. The wrecks of Ottoman ships sunk by the Italians are found in the waters of the Red Sea, south of Qunfudah.

It is also the base for the campaigns of the Ottomans and their allies supervising Asir, which has been previously called (Bandar) by the Ottomans, which means (market) in the Turkish language. King Ibn Saud ordered the Prince of Al Qunfudhah Sharif Abdullah ibn Hamza to leave it in April 1344 AH and appointed Mohammed ibn Agag prince on Qunfudah and Turki bin Mohammed Ibn Madi as the financial agent. As that port Qunfudah was an important port on the Red Sea coast where it contributed to receive large ships loaded from Yemen and the Levant. This port received Greek and Roman ocean-going ships to get the gold that exists in this region. It also received trade caravans and pilgrims to Mecca even after the takeover of the Saudi forces. The harbor was also receiving pilgrims from south of the Arabian Peninsula and pilgrims from South East Asia, particularly India pilgrims.

Geography 
It is located on the south-western border of the Makkah province, south of Al Lith, bordered by the Al Aradhiyah city. The province of Asir is southeast to the city and passes by the international coastal road of Jeddah - Jizan. It is located 290 km to the south from the holy city of Mecca, and 340 km away from Jeddah.

Population 
The estimated population of Al Qunfudhah is over 297,000 people divided between urban and coastal villages and abandonment, representing about 2.8% of the population of the province, which comes in fourth place of the region after the province of Ta'if in terms of population from the year 2013 according to Ministry of Health (Saudi Arabia).

 Jeddah Population 3,456,259 people.
 Mekkah Population 1,675,000 people.
 Al Ta'if Population 993,813 people.
 AL Qunfudhah Population 297,516 people.

Climate 
Al Qunfudhah has a long summer from March until end October, then a short fall 4 weeks after that a winter or spring that what locals of Al Qunfudhah prefer to call it from November until February. Its average annual temperature is the highest of Saudi Arabia.

The Administrative centers of Al Qunfudhah Governorate 
Al Qunfudhah is administratively divided into 10 administrative centers as follows:

 Al Qunfudhah: The administrative governorate center, located in the southwest of the Emirate of Makkah at a distance of 360 km. It has a population of 24,512, of which 8570 are foreign residents. And by all government departments, the commercial center of the neighboring villages.
 Al-Quoz Center: The largest and most populated province of AlQunfudhah, located in the south of the province, is 35 kilometers long and has 48,274 inhabitants. It adjoins a Bariq governorate from the west, and passes through the old convoys.
 Al-Muthilif Center: The second largest center of AlQunfudhah, located in the north of the governorate, is 45 kilometers long and home to 38,411 people.
 Hali Center: The third largest and most famous governorate center in history, located in the southern governorate of 81 kilometers, and home to 30,464 people.
 The center of Ahad Bani Zaid: It is located in the eastern part of the governorate, 18 kilometers away. It has a population of 19461 people and is the fourth largest community in AlQunfudhah. Ahad means in Sunday.
 Sabat Al-Jarah Center: Located in the eastern part of the governorate, 45 km away. It is home to 11,593 people, and in this center is a famous market known as the Spt or Saturday in English.
 Duqa Center: Located in the north of the governorate, 65 kilometers away, is the maximum centers of the province of AlQunfudhah to the north. It has 11,391 inhabitants.
 Kenana Center: Located in the south of the governorate, it is 85 km away. It is home to 6,390 people and is located next to Hali center.
 Thalotha Al-Kharam Center: Located in the northeast of the province, 65 kilometers away, with 3,601 inhabitants. Thalotha means Tuesday.
 Khamis Harb Center: The smallest centers of the governorate of AlQunfudhah. It is located in the eastern part of the governorate with a distance of 60 km. It has 714 inhabitants. Khamis means Thursday.

ِAl Qunfudhah Districts (Neighborhoods) 
The city of Al Qunfudhah consists of eight neighborhoods or districts and each neighborhood has a responsible elder who facilitates the affairs of the residents in front of the government agencies and he is appointed by the governor.

 Al-Shamiya neighborhood (District)
 Al-Naamiyah neighborhood (District)
 Al-Rotbah neighborhood (District)
 Al Khalidiya neighborhood ( District)
 Al-Gharbi neighborhood (District)
 Al-Sharqia neighborhood (District)
 Al-Azhar neighborhood (District)
 Al-Shataei neighborhood or Al-Borj Project (District)

Universities and academic centers 
Umm Al-Qura University ( Al Qunfudhah branch)
 University College of Umm Al Qura in Al Qunfudah.
 Faculty of Engineering Umm Al Qura University Branch AL Qunfudah.
 Faculty of Computer Science Umm Al Qura University Branch AL Qunfudah.
 Faculty of Medicine Umm Al Qura University Branch AL Qunfudah.
 Faculty of Health Sciences Umm Al Qura in Al Qunfudah.
Technical and Vocational Training Corporation (Al Qunfudhah branch)
 Al Qunfudhah Secondary Industrial Institute
 Technical College in Al Qunfudhah
 Institute of Development Cadres for Computer and English (Girls)
Scientific Institute of Imam Muhammad bin Saud Islamic University ( Al Qunfudhah branch).

Banks 
 Al-Rajhi Bank
 National Commercial Bank
 Al Bilad Bank
 Arab National Bank

Al Qunfudhah Regional Airport
On 5 December 2018 Prince Khalid Al Faisal Laid the foundation stone for establishing Al Qunfudhah airport to serve the people of three regions in Saudi Arabia. the location for the airport is 25 km north side of Al Qunfudhah in Al Modhailf county. The Area of the airport is 25,000,000 m2 which contains 3 terminals (Royal, travel and Cargo), one runway, Airport apron to accommodate five aircraft, Road network, Watch tower, Add an integrated infrastructure as well as parking and service facilities, Which will provide service to about 7 governorates and 50 administrative centers, follow three coastal and mountainous areas are Makkah, Al-Baha and Asir. These include Qanfudah, which has 10 centers, the Governorate of Aleirdhiat and its six centers, Al-Layth governorate with eight centers, Al-Baha, with five centers, and most of the centers of the nine Mokhwah governorate, as well as the governorate of Gamad al-Zind, with five centers, as well as the center of Tharban and Jamaa Rabia. The airport will officially open in 2021.

In 2019 an agreement to establish the airport was signed between the General Authority of Civil Aviation (GACA) and Nesma and Partners Contracting Company. The airport that will have the capacity to accommodate half a million passengers costs a total amount of SR840 million.

See also

 List of cities and towns in Saudi Arabia

References

1925 establishments in Saudi Arabia
Populated places established in 1925
Qunfudhah
Qunfudhah
Port cities in the Arabian Peninsula
Port cities and towns in Saudi Arabia
Port cities and towns of the Red Sea
Underwater diving sites in Saudi Arabia